Moges Tadesse (born 28 June 1993) is an Ethiopian footballer who plays as a defender for Ethiopian Coffee.

References

External links
 

1993 births
Living people
Sportspeople from Addis Ababa
Ethiopian footballers
Ethiopia international footballers
Association football defenders
Adama City F.C. players